Giuseppe Baldacci (3 April 1856 – ?) was an Italian architect.

He was born in Florence and studied at the Florentine Istituto Tecnico and the Accademia di Belle Arti. He then joined the architects Castellazzi and Cesare Spighi in designing the reliefs for the church of Santa Trinita. He built a small villino in via Masaccio, Florence for Odoardo Salvestri, and restored the stables for Doctor Folli in Borgo San Jacopo. In 1887 he won a thousand lire prize for designing sheds and stables for a park in a Renaissance style.

References

1856 births
19th-century Italian architects
Architects from Florence
Year of death missing